A Malassay (Harari: መለሳይ Mäläsay) was a member of the elite infantry units that formed the Adal Sultanate's household troops. According to Manfred Kropp, Malassay were the Harari armed forces.

Etymology
Malassay appears to refer to a military rank or warrior in Afar and Harari languages. According to Dr. Duri Mohammed and others, Malassay in ancient times attributed to Harari serviceman however in the present day it refers to a brotherhood or member of a fraternity. According to Harari scholar Abdurrahman Qorram, Malassay derives from the root Harari term mälä meaning to provide solutions.

History

Early Ge'ez and Portuguese texts indicate Muslim soldiers were known as the Malassay. In the thirteenth century the Malassay appear to back the Amhara rebel Yekuno Amlak in his conflict with the Zagwe dynasty. Historians have identified the Gafat regiments of the Malassay played a key role in founding the Christian Solomonic dynasty.

Ahmad ibn Ibrahim al-Ghazi was originally a Malassay serving under a Garad named Abun Adashe prior to becoming leader of the Adal Sultanate.
In the sixteenth century the main troops of Adal Sultanate's leader Ahmad ibn Ibrahim al-Ghazi were the Malassay during the invasion of Abyssinia. One of the leaders of the Muslim forces of Malassay was a Gaturi named Amir Husain bin Abubaker. The Malassay participated in the conquest of Abyssinia at the decisive Battle of Shimbra Kure. Emperor Lebna Dengel chronicles states the Malassay alongside Qecchin were the Muslim enemy that invaded.
According to Mohammed Hassan the Malassay under Ahmed consisted of the Harla and Harari ethnic groups. Ethiopian historian Merid Wolde Aregay associated the Malassay with Semitic speakers. 

In the reign of Emperor Sarsa Dengel, the Hadiya Kingdom was supported by 500 Malassay donning cuirass who had arrived from Harar territory to battle Ethiopia. Sarsa Dengel chronicles mentions Malassay rebels of Elmag (an unidentified group) and the Somali under their Harari moniker Tumur had deserted thus Manfred Kropp argues the Malassay were of diverse ethnic backgrounds.

Under the seventeenth century Emirate of Harar, the entire army was commanded by a Garad who had several militias under him labeled the Malassay. In the contemporary era, the term Malassay survives as a subgroup of the Harari people. According to Umar, Malga-Gello the forefather of the Siltʼe people's clan Ulbareg was a captain of the Malassay.

See also
 Harari people
 Afar people
 Garad

References

Adal Sultanate
Military history of Africa
Infantry units and formations
Warfare of the Middle Ages
Military units and formations of the Middle Ages